Bobritzsch-Hilbersdorf is a municipality in the Mittelsachsen district of Saxony, Germany, created with effect from 1 January 2012 by the merger of Bobritzsch and Hilbersdorf.

References 

Mittelsachsen